

The Monnett Moni is a sport aircraft developed in the United States in the early 1980s and marketed for homebuilding.

Designed by John Monnett, who coined the term "air recreation vehicle" to describe it, it is a single-seat motorglider with a low, cantilever wing and a V-tail. Construction is of metal throughout, and it is intended to be easy and inexpensive to build and fly. Like many sailplanes, the main undercarriage is a single monowheel, which in this case was mounted in a streamlined fairing beneath the fuselage and is not retractable, with a steerable tailwheel behind it. Builders are also given the option of constructing their example with fixed tricycle undercarriage. Power is provided by a small two-cylinder, horizontally opposed, air-cooled engine.

Examples of the Moni are on display at the Steven F. Udvar-Hazy Center of the National Air and Space Museum, and the EAA AirVenture Museum.

Variants
The Sonex Xenos motorglider is an evolution of the Moni, and provided much of the design foundation for the Sonex line of aircraft.

The all-electric-powered Electric Aircraft Corporation ElectraFlyer-C is a modified Monnett Moni in taildragger configuration.

Specifications (with tricycle gear)

Notes

References

 

Monnett aircraft
Homebuilt aircraft
1980s United States sport aircraft
V-tail aircraft
Single-engined tractor aircraft
Low-wing aircraft
Aircraft first flown in 1981